Chad Muma (born August 18, 1999) is an American football linebacker for the Jacksonville Jaguars of the National Football League (NFL). He played college football at Wyoming and was drafted by the Jacksonville Jaguars in the third round of the 2022 NFL Draft.

Early life and high school
Muma grew up in Lone Tree, Colorado. He was diagnosed with Type 1 diabetes while in the seventh grade. Muma attended Legend High School, where he initially played defensive back. He was named second-team Class 5A All-State as senior after finishing the season with 77 tackles and 8 tackles for loss despite missing half of Legend's games due to a torn patella. Muma committed to play college football at Wyoming, where his father had played, over offers from Colorado State, Hawaii and Nevada.

College career
Muma played in all 12 of Wyoming's games as a freshman, mostly on special teams. He began to see significant playing time on defense during his sophomore season and finished the year with 51 total tackles. As a junior, Muma led the Cowboys with 71 tackles, eight tackles for loss, and three sacks and was named first-team All-Mountain West Conference. For his senior season, he doubled his tackle output to 142, again had 8 tackles for loss, had 1.5 sacks, added 3 interceptions for 45 return yards, and a fumble recovery as well, enroute to another All-Mountain West season. Muma was invited to play in the 2022 Senior Bowl and was named a finalist for the Butkus Award.

Professional career

Muma was drafted in the third round (70th overall) of the 2022 NFL Draft by the Jacksonville Jaguars. The Jaguars reportedly selected Muma after hearing that the Broncos were planning to draft him 75th overall.  He was the fourth inside linebacker selected in the draft and the second inside linebacker selected by the Jaguars after they drafted Devin Lloyd in the first round.

Personal life
Muma's father, Ty Muma, and his maternal grandfather, Rick Desmarais, also played college football at Wyoming. Chad’s younger sister Payton plays basketball at Gonzaga University.

References

External links
Jacksonville Jaguars bio
Wyoming Cowboys bio

Living people
Players of American football from Colorado
American football linebackers
Wyoming Cowboys football players
People from Douglas County, Colorado
People with type 1 diabetes
Jacksonville Jaguars players
1999 births